Goalanda is an upazila of Rajbari District in the Division of Dhaka, Bangladesh.

Geography
It has 15,694 housing units and has a total area of 149.03 km2.

Demographics
Goalanda had a population of 91,675 in the 1991 Bangladesh census. Males constitute 52.1% of the population, and females 47.9%. The population aged over eighteen was 44,854. Goalandaghat has an average literacy rate of 20.5% (7+ years), compared to the national average of 32.4%.

Administration
Goalanda Upazila is divided into Goalanda Municipality and four union parishads: Chotovakla, Debugram, Doulatdia, and Uzancar. The union parishads are subdivided into 56 mauzas and 152 villages.

Goalanda Municipality is subdivided into 9 wards and 45 mahallas.

See also
 Upazilas of Bangladesh
 Districts of Bangladesh
 Divisions of Bangladesh

References

External links
 Goalondo in Encyclopædia Britannica

Upazilas of Rajbari District